Anastasia Ryabova (born in Moscow in 1985) is a contemporary artist who won the 2011 Kandinsky Prize in media projects for her work, Artist's Private Collections, a virtual "museum of contemporary art based on artists' private collections". She is known for works that play "linguistic games." She was also the Soratnik awards laureate for 2011. Her art has been exhibited in Russia, Austria, Italy, and Germany.

In 2015, she was included in the list of promising young artists of Russia according to Forbes, and in 2017 in the TOP 100 young authors according to InArt.

She holds a Master of Philosophy from the National Research University Higher School of Economics.

Biography 

Born in 1985 in Moscow. The creator of “Artist's Private Collections” is an online archive of works of contemporary art from private collections of artists. The site project “Artist's Private Collections” was carried out with the initial financial support of the Victoria Foundation and the Sandretto Re Rebaoudengo Foundation in the framework of the Russian-Italian exhibition Modernikon. One of the authors of the magazine.biz project, an online store where you can’t buy anything (all products are painted by artists Alexei Buldakov, Alexandra Galkina, Alisa Yoffe, Zhanna Kadyrova, Viktor Makarov, Lena Martynova, Maxim Roganov, Anastasia Ryabova, David Ter-Oganyanom and Olga Chtak).

In 2011, she was twice nominated for the Kandinsky Prize. For the prize of the young artist of the year, Anastasia Ryabova put on the plastic work “Where is your banner, dude?”, And for the prize “Project of the year in the field of media art” - her own no-art project “Artist's Private Collections”. As a result, the artist won the second nomination and became the only woman to receive the Kandinsky Prize in the nomination “Project of the Year in the Field of Media Art”. 

In 2011, she carried out the project “Artist's Ride Space”, arranging on her own bicycle, in a small “window” under the wheel, an art gallery of one work. During the year, the works of Alice Yoffe, Alexei Buldakov, Valery Chtak and other artists were exhibited there.

In 2012, with the support of the Victoria Foundation, it launched The False Calculations Presidium project. The exhibition was held in a non-standard place for Moscow - in the Museum of entrepreneurs, philanthropists and benefactors.

In 2015, together with the artist Varvara Gevorgizova, she created the "Night Movement", which is a series of events in the genre of relational aesthetics. Being a voluntary organizational network moderated by its founders, the "Night Movement" is a specially organized process, orchestrated according to one scenario or another.

In 2021 author of the geometric "Route H³" of the V-A-C fund for the "Museum Four" project.

List of exhibitions

Personal shows 

 JDOO ILI DOO (shared with Marianna Abovyan), Institute of Fossil Fuels, Moscow, 2021
 Discord Show / Sticker packs, Work More! Rest More!, Online, Minsk, 2020
 + (+++), FFTN, Saint-Petersburg, 2019
 From Your Morning to My Night, Zarya AiR studio, Vladivostok, 2019
 Candy and toffee on the edge of feud or where to find four mistakes?, The Foundation of Vladimir Smirnov and Konstantine Sorokin, Moscow, 2017
 Candy and toffee on the edge of feud or where to find four mistakes?, Academy of Fine Arts, Tasku-galleria Näyttely, Helsinki, 2016
 Reverse Motion Inventory, Triangle Curatorial Studio, Moscow, 2015
 Star Tonnel, Banka Gallery, Moscow, 2013
 Billion (shared with A. Buldakov), Cultural Center Art Propaganda, Samara, 2011
 artistsprivatecollections.org (as part of the “Top” project), ARCOmadrid, Madrid, 2011
 Annual Report, As part of the parallel program of the art fair COSMOSCOW, Moscow, 2010
 It Works!. Brown Stripe Gallery, Moscow, 2010
 TrolleyTram&Transp! (Jointly with M. Roganov). LabGarage Gallery, Kyev, 2009
 Crowds of angry cunts, FABRIKA Project, Moscow, 2006

Group shows 

 Salute, SPHERE Contemporary Art Foundation, Moscow, 2021
 Neoinfantilism, DK Gromov, Saint Petersburg, 2020
 Infographics, Cube.Moscow, Moscow, 2019
 VII PERMANENT COLLECTION, Moscow Museum of Modern Art, Moscow, 2016
 Metageography. Space — Image — Action, Tretyakov Gallery, Moscow, 2015
 Vertical Reach, Artspace, New Haven, 2015.
 Referendum on withdrawal from the human race, Teatr Powszechny, Warsaw, 2014
 Weightlessness, National Centre for Contemporary Arts, Nizhny Novgorod, 2013
 5th Moscow Biennale of Contemporary Art - Presented a piece "Your Money Works No More Here", Moscow, 2013
 The Compromise Unidee in residence final expedition, Arte al Centro, Biella, 2013
 Toasting the Revolution, Family Business, New York, 2012 
 4th Moscow Biennale of Contemporary Art, Moscow, 2011
 Modernikon Palazzio, Casa dei Tre Oci, Venice, 2011
 Modernikon, Fondazione Sandretto Re Rebaudengo, Turin, 2010
 TAPE IT!, Centre D’art Contemporain “OUI”, Grenoble, 2010
 Moscou dans la valise, Les Salaisons Romainville, Paris, 2010
 Policy in streets!, FABRIKA Project, Moscow, 2008

Curatorial projects 

 The False Calculations Presidium, Museum of Entrepreneurs, Patrons and Philanthropists, Moscow, 2012
 Artists' Ride Space, Moscow, 2011

Works are in the following collections 

 Gazprombank, Moscow
 V-A-C Foundation, Moscow
 Moscow Museum of Modern Art, Moscow
 Zarya Foundation, Vladivostok

References

External links 

 Personal site of Anastasia Ryabova
 Project Artist's Private Collections website
 Project site "megazine.biz" 
 Website of the project “Artists' Ride Space” 
 
 Four Museums - Н³ Anastasia Ryabova’s geometric walk

1985 births
Artists from Moscow
Russian installation artists
21st-century Russian artists
21st-century Russian women artists
Living people
Russian contemporary artists
Russian women painters
Contemporary painters
Kandinsky Prize
Higher School of Economics alumni